The Umbrian regional election of 1970 took place on 7–8 June 1970.

Events
The Italian Communist Party was by far the largest party. After the election, Communist Pietro Conti formed a left-wing coalition government with the Italian Socialist Party and the Italian Socialist Party of Proletarian Unity (Popular Democratic Front).

Results

Source: Ministry of the Interior

Elections in Umbria
1970 elections in Italy